San Remigio is the name of two places in the Philippines:

 San Remigio, Antique
 San Remigio, Cebu

And of a church in Florence:

 San Remigio di Firenze